High Council for Human rights (Sitad-e Heqâvâq-e Beshir) is the governmental national human rights institution of Iran, subdivision to the Judiciary of Iran.

Positions 
The council rejects and condemns appointment of Special Rapporteur on Human Rights in Iran by United Nations and strongly opposes the western countries' positions about current human rights situation in Iran. It also assumes the “true face” of human rights should be sought through Islam.

The council has challenged laws against Holocaust denial, spread of Islamophobia, forced unveiling in schools, specifically in France as being against human rights.

See also 
 Human rights in Iran

References 

National human rights institutions
Human rights organisations based in Iran
Judiciary of Iran